Botticelli most often refers to:
 Sandro Botticelli, Italian painter of the Early Renaissance

Botticelli may also refer to:

People
Botticelli is a surname of Italian origin:
 Michael Botticelli (figure skater), American figure skater
 Michael Botticelli (politician), US

Other uses 
 Botticelli (game), a guessing game about famous people
 Botticelli (play), by Terrence McNally
 Botticelli (crater), a crater on Mercury
 Botticelli's Venus, a painting by Sandro Botticelli
 The Botticellis, a US band

See also
 Botticella, an Italian surname, as in Domenico Botticella

Surnames of Italian origin